Deborah Wallace (born 1974) is a Scottish born actress, playwright and producer.

Career 
Her plays include Psyche based on the life of James Miranda Barry (2005), Homesick (2007), and The Void with Hybrid Stage Project (2010), and All American Enemy.

Wallace co-produced Gasland and Gasland II, and How to Let Go of the World.

References

Scottish dramatists and playwrights
Alumni of the Royal Conservatoire of Scotland
Living people
Scottish women dramatists and playwrights
Actresses from Glasgow
Theatre people from Glasgow
20th-century Scottish actresses
21st-century Scottish actresses
21st-century Scottish women writers
21st-century Scottish dramatists and playwrights
20th-century Scottish dramatists and playwrights
20th-century Scottish women writers
1974 births